The Challenger Mountains are a mountain range on Ellesmere Island in Nunavut, Canada. The range is the most northern range in the world and of the Arctic Cordillera. The highest mountain in the range is Commonwealth Mountain . The United States Range is immediately to the east of the Challenger Mountains.

The range lies within Quttinirpaaq National Park, the second most northerly park in the world after Northeast Greenland National Park in Greenland.

Low elevation lakes located along Taconite Inlet are part of the Challenger Mountains and local relief exceeds .

Further reading 
 United States. Hydrographic Office, Sailing Directions for Northern Canada: The Coast of Labrador Northward of St. Lewis Sound, the Northern Coast of the Canadian Mainland, and the Canadian Archipelago, Second Edition, 1951 P 513

References

External links 
 

Mountain ranges of Qikiqtaaluk Region
Arctic Cordillera